Hang Ha Po is a village in Lam Tsuen, Tai Po District, Hong Kong.

Administration
Hang Ha Po is a recognized village under the New Territories Small House Policy.

References

External links
 Delineation of area of existing village Hang Ha Po (Tai Po) for election of resident representative (2019 to 2022)
 Antiquities Advisory Board. Historic Building Appraisal. Lam Ancestral Hall, No. 11 Hang Ha Po, Tai Po. Pictures
 Antiquities Advisory Board. Historic Building Appraisal. Lam Ancestral Hall, No. 13 Hang Ha Po, Tai Po. Pictures

Villages in Tai Po District, Hong Kong
Lam Tsuen